A Quiet Outpost is a 2011 Russian war drama film directed by Sergey Makhovikov.

Plot 
The film tells about the battle of Afghan and Tajik militants with the Russian army, which occurred at the 12th border outpost of the Moscow border detachment in the Republic of Tajikistan on July 13, 1993.

Cast 
 Andrey Chadov as Capt. Andrey Pankov
 Sergey Selin as Sgt. Vladimir Gritsyuk
 Igor Savochkin as Lt. Aleksandr Bobrovskiy
 Aleksandr Alyoshkin as Trasser
 Yuri Konovalov as Sgt. Durov
 Anusher Bachonayev as Abdulla
 Maksim Dimkovich as Maks
 Timur Efremenkov as Nazarin
 Radzhab Khuseynov as Zakir
 Nina Kornienko as Olga Nikolayevna

References

External links 
 

2011 films
2010s Russian-language films
Russian war drama films
2011 war drama films
Films scored by Eduard Artemyev